Hamdo Ejubović (born 10 April 1959) is a Bosnian politician who has been the Municipal mayor of Hadžići since 30 November 2004.

He has also been a member and one of the founders of the Party of Democratic Action (SDA) since 1990.

References

External links
Hamdo Ejubović at avaz.ba

1959 births
Living people
People from Hadžići
Bosniaks of Bosnia and Herzegovina
Bosnia and Herzegovina Muslims
Politicians of the Federation of Bosnia and Herzegovina
Party of Democratic Action politicians